Death by Magic is an American reality television show. The eight-episode first season premiered on Netflix on November 30, 2018. The series stars and was created by British magician Drummond Money-Coutts. It features Money-Coutts researching the myths and legends behind magic tricks and stunts that allegedly led to a performer's death. After learning the details of the original stunt gone wrong, Money-Coutts attempts to recreate the performance.

Episodes

References

External links 
  on Netflix
 

2018 American television series debuts
English-language Netflix original programming
American television magic shows
2010s American reality television series
Television shows filmed in South Africa
Television shows filmed in Miami
Television shows filmed in Michigan
Television shows shot in London
Television shows shot in the Las Vegas Valley
Television shows filmed in India
Television shows filmed in Scotland
Television shows filmed in Los Angeles